Ophiacanthida is an order of echinoderms belonging to the class Ophiuroidea.

Families:

 Ophiodermatina Ljungman, 1867
 Ophiodermatidae
 Ophiomyxidae
 Ophiopezidae
 Ophiocomidae
 Ophiacanthina O'Hara, Hugall, Thuy, Stöhr & Martynov, 2017
 Clarkcomidae
 Ophiacanthidae
 Ophiobyrsidae
 Ophiocamacidae
 Ophiopteridae
 Ophiotomidae
Ophiojuridae

References

 
Ophiuroidea
Echinoderm orders